Scoparia gracilis is a moth in the family Crambidae.  It is endemic to New Zealand.

Taxonomy

It was described by Alfred Philpott in 1924. However the placement of this species within the genus Scoparia is in doubt. As a result, this species has also been referred to as Scoparia (s.l.) gracilis.

Description

The wingspan is 16–19 mm. The forewings are pale-brownish, irrorated with black and white and with white lines, as well as a white-margined black band at the base. The hindwings are greyish-fuscous. Adults have been recorded on wing in December and January.

References

Moths described in 1924
Scorparia
Moths of New Zealand
Endemic fauna of New Zealand
Endemic moths of New Zealand